Duke You of Jin (died 416 BC) was from 433 to 416 BC the titular ruler of the State of Jin during the transition period from the Spring and Autumn period to the Warring States period of ancient China.  His ancestral name was Ji, given name Liu, and Duke You was his posthumous title.  He succeeded his father, Duke Jing of Jin, who died in 434 BC.

By the time of Duke You's reign, Jin had already been partitioned into three de facto states of Han, Zhao, and Wei.  The only territories under the Duke's control were the traditional capitals Jiang and Quwo.  Even though he was the nominal head of the state, he had to pay tribute to the rulers of Han, Zhao, and Wei.

Duke You reigned for 18 years and died in 416 BC.  Marquess Wen of Wei installed his son Zhi on the throne, who was later known as Duke Lie of Jin.  According to the Records of the Grand Historian,  Duke You was killed by bandits when he secretly left the city at night to meet his mistress.

References

Year of birth unknown
Monarchs of Jin (Chinese state)
5th-century BC Chinese monarchs
416 BC deaths
5th-century BC murdered monarchs
Assassinated Chinese politicians